Swist or Świst is a surname. It may refer to:

 Piotr Świst (born 1968), Polish speedway rider
 Tomasz Świst (born 1974), Polish speed skater
 Wally Swist (born 1953), American poet and writer

See also
 

Polish-language surnames